Ana Ivanovic was the defending champion, but chose to participate in Linz instead.

Elena Dementieva won in the final 2–6, 6–4, 7–6(7–4), against Caroline Wozniacki.

Seeds

Draw

Finals

Top half

Bottom half

External links
Draw and Qualifying draw

Luxembourg Open
Fortis Championships Luxembourg
2008 in Luxembourgian tennis